Ferdo Kovačević (8 April 1870, Zagreb - 1 September 1927, Zagreb) was a Croatian painter and art professor.

Biography 
His father was the inventor and telegraphy pioneer, Ferdinand Kovačević. 

In 1888, he graduated from the technical school in Zagreb. Thanks to a grant, he was able to study at the Vienna School of Arts and Crafts until 1893. After that, he trained in Italy. From 1902, he was a drawing teacher at the Forestry Academy then, after 1905, at the Arts and Crafts School. He received the title of Professor there in 1909.

He also taught geometry, perspective and decorative painting at the Academy of Fine Arts, University of Zagreb; becoming a professor there in 1917 and an Academician in 1919. From 1925 to 1926, he served as Vice-Rector.

He was a co-founder of the Society of Croatian Artists. For many years, he exhibited in Prague, Belgrade and Sofia as well as at the Salon in Paris.

Most of work involved landscapes. In his early period, he was influenced by Symbolism; painting dark forests and cemeteries. Later, he came under the influence of Impressionism; painting river scenes and landscapes with snow. He participated in designing decorations for the National and University Library when it was moved to a new building in 1913 and he was among the artists who provided murals and icons for Križevci Cathedral.

His painting, "The Tempest", was used on a Croatian postage stamp in 2017.

Works

Sources
 Biographical notes @ the Hrvatska Enciklopedija
 Life and works @ the Galerija Remek-djela

External links 

 More works by Kovačević @ the Galerija Divila

1870 births
1927 deaths
Croatian painters
Croatian landscape painters
Artists from Zagreb
Academic staff of the University of Applied Arts Vienna